Sunnidale may refer to the following places in Canada:

Sunnidale, Lambton County, Ontario
Sunnidale, Simcoe County, Ontario
Sunnidale Corners, Ontario

See also
Sunnydale (disambiguation)
Sunningdale, a village in Berkshire, England